Jianchuan County is a county in the Dali Bai Autonomous Prefecture located in the western part of Yunnan Province, China.

The historical town of Shaxi in the southeast of the county lies on the old Tea Horse Road to Bengal.
China National Highway 214, from Xining to Jinghong in southern Yunnan, passes through the northeast of the county.

Administrative divisions
Jianchuan County has 5 towns and 3 townships. 
5 towns

3 townships
 Yangcen
 Misha
 Xiangtu

Climate

References

External links
 Jianchuan County Official Website

County-level divisions of Dali Bai Autonomous Prefecture